= Bayanhaote Basin =

Basin of China

Geography
- Location: Inner Mongolia
- Country: China

The Bayanhaote Basin (simplified Chinese: 巴彦浩特盆地; traditional Chinese: 巴彥浩特盆地; pinyin: Bāyànhàotè Péndì), also known as Bayanhot Basin, is a geographic region located in the west-central part of Inner Mongolia Autonomous Region. It is a superimposed basin that underwent a long-term sedimentary evolution process from transgression to retrogression during the Carboniferous to Late Permian.

The Bayanhot Basin is a composite and superimposed basin developed in the crossing zone of the Qinlin-Qilian-Helan trifurcate rift system (秦、祁、贺三叉裂谷系) during the beginning of Early Palaeozoic Era (早古生代早期).

It has been a self-flowing tectonic basin since the Mesozoic. In the early 1950s, oil and gas exploration in this area began.
